Lipníky is a village and municipality in Prešov District in the Prešov Region of eastern Slovakia.

History
The village was built in 1990 making it one of the newest settlements in the entire country of Slovakia.

Geography

References

External links
 
 

Villages and municipalities in Prešov District
Šariš